Sanjeev Sanyal is an Indian economist and popular historian. He is a member of the Economic Advisory Council to the Prime Minister of India, and has helped prepare six editions of the Economic Survey of India starting in 2017.  Sanyal has written several books on Indian history to mixed reviews.

Early life and education
Sanjeev Sanyal was born in Kolkata and studied at St. Xavier's School and St. James' School. He received a Bachelor's degree in economics from Shri Ram College of Commerce, New Delhi. He then went to St John's College, University of Oxford, where he received a BA in philosophy, politics and economics in 1992, and later received an MSc in Economics in 1994.

Career
Sanyal began working in financial economics in the 1990s. In 2004, Sanyal and environmental economist Pavan Sukhdev created the Green Indian States Trust to promote sustainable development.

Sanyal worked as chief economist for South and Southeast Asia at Deutsche Bank until 2008, leaving to research and write Land of the Seven Rivers, and returned in 2011. By 2015, when he resigned, he was a managing director and global strategist.

He has also served on the Future City Sub-Committee of the Singapore government tasked with building a long-term vision for the city-state.

In 2017, he was appointed as the Principal Economic Adviser to the Indian Ministry of Finance and in that job helped prepare six editions of the Economic Survey of India. In February 2022, he was appointed member of the Economic Advisory Council to the Prime Minister in the rank of the Secretary to Government of India.

Sanyal anchors Economic Sutra, a show telecasted on Sansad TV, the official channel of the Parliament of India. The series covers various aspects of economic and financial policies, regulatory elements and institutional frameworks to be decoded for the average citizen's understanding.

Views 
Sanyal has been a vocal critic of Nehruvian socialism, which he deems to have stemmed from an "inward-looking cultural attitude". Nehru and P. C. Mahalanobis are criticized for treating the economy as a "mechanical toy", leaving little scope for the flourish of private enterprises, and ultimately throttling creativity. Sanyal praises the 1991 liberalisation reforms as the harbinger of Indian Renaissance, and argues for the application of Complex Adaptive Systems framework to economic issues.

Among his most-espoused views is that the historiography of India has been distorted with "Colonial, Nehruvian, and Marxist" biases — thus, requiring a "rewriting" of history by "properly revisiting" primary sources. In The Ocean of Churn, Sanyal argues that the primary sources used in painting a humane image of Ashoka can also be interpreted to reconstruct him as a genocidal tyrant. According to Sanyal, Ashoka did not convert to Buddhism out of laments at the Kalinga War but due to political pressure exerted by the Jains. A host of other sources are invoked to compare Ashoka with "modern day fundamentalists", whose Dhaṃma Mahāmātās were "religious police"; the famed edicts about religious tolerance are read as propaganda.

Sanyal blames the Nehruvian project for having established Ashoka as a "great king", and stresses on the urgent need of a post-socialist reading of history. In Sanyal's version of this reading, the central character is Chanakya, a "professor of Political Economy at Taxila university" who had helped Chandragupta Maurya establish a pan-Indian empire and who then wrote Arthashastra about a centralised Mauryan economy. Only when the Arthshastra is retrofitted to India's current political economy —by fixing the judicial system, investing in internal security, and simplifying taxation rules— among other things, Sanyal believes that we can return to the "golden age" of India that had birthed "yoga, algebra, the concept of zero, chess, plastic surgery, metallurgy, Hinduism, [and] Buddhism."

Reception 
Meera Visvanathan, a historian of ancient India, finds Sanyal ignorant of methodologies in historical research. Despite his grand vision to rewrite history, Sanyal's citations remained restricted to mainstream popular histories and seldom bothered with primary sources. In deconstructing the narrative of Ashoka, Sanyal failed to apply source-criticism and imposed a host of anachronistic categories on the past. Likewise, Sanyal remained oblivious of recent scholarship on Mauryan India and misrecognised a shastra of political economy, as it developed in Ancient India, as a manual of Mauryan statecraft. Similarly, Sanyal's analysis of the Mahabharata was an exercise in speculation to fit preconceived notions of history. Overall, Visvanathan found his works to be "riddled with holes" which commanded popularity among masses only because of Sanyal's "rhetorical flourish" and a simplicity that synced to majoritarian prejudices. Sanyal's work having not been critiqued or contested by professional historians, who have never taken him seriously, is why, Visvanathan suggests, he has grown in stature and confidence. Rohan D'Souza, a historian of South Asia at Kyoto University, approved of Visvanathan's critique as a "reality-check" to Sanyal's amateur efforts at rewriting history.

Manu Pillai, a popular historian, commends The Ocean of Churn for being a "delightful introduction to the world of the Indian Ocean" despite the possibility of professional scholars challenging his narrative and conclusions. He welcomed Sanyal's command over a layered and complex past, his "accessible" yet "captivating narrative", and especially the reevaluation of Ashoka. Shiv Visvanathan, a social anthropologist specializing in science and technology studies, praised the same work for being a feisty, combative, and comprehensive history of the Indian Ocean aimed at a general audience but cautioned that "a professional historian might crib". Like Pillai, he commends the "devastating" reconstruction of Ashoka and recovering figures from the margins of history.

Honours 
Sanyal was awarded an Eisenhower Fellowship in 2007 for his work on urban issues. In 2010, he was named Young Global Leader by the World Economic Forum. He has been an Adjunct Fellow of the Institute of Policy Studies at the National University of Singapore and Senior Fellow of IDFC Institute (Mumbai). Sanyal has been a fellow of the Royal Geographical Society, London, visiting scholar at Oxford University, adjunct fellow at the Institute of Policy Studies (Singapore), and a senior fellow of the World Wide Fund for Nature (formerly World Wildlife Fund).

Works

Books
The Indian Renaissance: India's Rise After A Thousand Years of Decline, World Scientific, 2008, 264 p.
Land of the Seven Rivers: A Brief History of India's Geography, Penguin, 2013, 192 p.
The Incredible History of India's Geography, Penguin, 2015, 264 p.
The Ocean of Churn: How the Indian Ocean Shaped Human History, Penguin, 2017, 324 p.
Life over Two Beers and Other Stories, Penguin, 2018, 232 p.
India in the Age of Ideas: Select Writings, 2006-2018, Westland, 2018, 318 p.
Revolutionaries : The Other Story of How India Won Its Freedom, HarperCollins India, 2023, 364 p.

Columns 
Sanyal is an occasional columnist for the Hindustan Times, Project Syndicate, The Economic Times, Live Mint, Business Standard, and several other publications.

Notes

References

External links
 Sanyal's Homepage
 Sanyal's Business Standard columns

Living people
1970 births
20th-century Indian economists
Indian Rhodes Scholars
Alumni of St John's College, Oxford
Scientists from Kolkata
Indian environmentalists
Shri Ram College of Commerce alumni
Urban theorists
21st-century Indian economists